Master Pandemonium is a fictional supervillain appearing in American comic books published by Marvel Comics.

Publication history

The character first appeared in The West Coast Avengers vol. 2 #4 (Jan. 1986).

Fictional character biography
Martin Preston was born in Rutland, Vermont. He was originally an actor who lost an arm in a car crash, and made a pact with Mephisto to regain his limb. Mephisto instead took the man's other three limbs, then replaced them all with demonic grafts. He was also given a hole in his chest in the shape of an inverted five-pointed star, and the ability to survive despite this hole in his chest. He was also given the ability to command the demons inside him.

At some point, Master Pandemonium became the CEO of Anvil Pictures.

Master Pandemonium went seeking the five beings possessing parts of his fragmented soul. He attacked Firebird to ascertain whether she was one of these five beings, and then attacked the Thing for the same reason, and wound up battling the Thing and the West Coast Avengers. Master Pandemonium was then revealed as the master of the demon Riglevio who had infiltrated the Rangers disguised as Shooting Star. He also revealed how he was originally transformed by Mephisto. He then battled the West Coast Avengers again. Master Pandemonium battled the West Coast Avengers once again, as well as Daimon Hellstrom, Hellcat, and the demon Allatou. Alongside the West Coast Avengers, he battled the Cat People in the Land Within, and regained one fragment of "his" soul.

Master Pandemonium later became stranded on the planet Arcturus IV. Alongside the Fantastic Four, he encountered Comet Man and Max, and then returned to Earth.

Master Pandemonium then abducted and absorbed Thomas and William, the "children" of the Vision and the Scarlet Witch, who were actually two of the soul fragments he sought. He regained and replaced all five missing soul fragments, but then collapsed into a magical "black hole" within himself. Mephisto then appeared and revealed that the soul fragments sought by Master Pandemonium were actually portions of Mephisto's own fragmented essence, not Pandemonium's, as he had been led to believe by Mephisto; having been spiritually fractured during a confrontation with Franklin Richards, Mephisto had used Pandemonium to seek out the missing fragments of his own soul rather than expend energy by searching himself.

Master Pandemonium was imprisoned for a time within Mephisto's realm, until he was freed by the nexus being known as Lore. Master Pandemonium's appearance was changed to an inhuman form by the torments in suffered at the hands of the Rakasha. With the assistance of his newfound ally, Pandemonium sought to capture the Scarlet Witch. The Scarlet Witch, with the help of Agatha Harkness and the Avengers, fought him off. When Pandemonium finally succeeded in kidnapping the Scarlet Witch, he was betrayed by his erstwhile ally Lore, who attempted to sacrifice both Pandemonium and the Scarlet Witch. Pandemonium was seemingly obliterated in the ensuing battle with Lore.

Young Avengers members Wiccan and Speed (while searching for their mother the Scarlet Witch) encountered Master Pandemonium in their mother's former home in Leonia, New Jersey (incorrectly stated to be in Cresskill, New Jersey). He had reverted to a more human look, and claimed to be in hiding due to the belief his schemes had helped precipitate the Scarlet Witch's breakdown. After a brief battle, the two Young Avengers deemed that Pandemonium was not an active threat, and left peacefully.

Master Pandemonium reappears in the Ghost Riders: Heaven's on Fire miniseries. In this appearance he appears to be fighting with his own demonic limbs (they try to drown him in his own breakfast cereal). Former Ghost Rider Danny Ketch appears, bludgeons him with a bat and wishes to use his chest as a doorway in order to make a deal with Satan to defeat Zadkiel. Pandemomium begs Ketch to kill him at this point. The deal Ketch proposes involves saving a teenager who is apparently the antichrist. Later in the series, the new Caretaker is ambushed and attacked and rendered unconscious by a seemingly recovered and much more sinister Master Pandemonium in the evil church that the child Anti-Christ, dubbed as Kid Blackheart, leads her to. Using the hole in Master Pandemonium's chest as a doorway to Hell, Kid Blackheart calls forth an army of demons so he can march on Heaven and claim it for himself. While Kid Blackheart's army is defeated in Heaven by an army of Ghost Riders, Master Pandemonium and the remaining demons are themselves defeated by Daimon Hellstrom and Jaine Cutter. Both villains are later seen alongside Blackout in a strip club as they plan their next move.

Master Pandemonium appears in a cameo as one of the villains summoned by Sin to battle Earth's heroes.

As part of the Marvel NOW! event, Master Pandemonium was recruited by Kade Kilgore to be a teacher at the Hellfire Club's Hellfire Academy, where Master Pandemonium teaches Hell Literature.

Pandemonium eventually made his way to San Francisco, where he formed a cult of demons to boost his own power, but he was eventually defeated by the Superior Spider-Man and Doctor Strange, Strange redirecting a demonic portal Pandemonium had attempted to open to trap the villain back in Mephisto's realm.

Powers and abilities
Master Pandemonium was given superhuman powers through the replacement of his arms with those of demons and his bodily transformation into a living "abode of demons" by Mephisto. He has superhuman strength in his arms, and he has the ability to detach his arms and legs, without harm to himself, and have them turn into demonic servitors. He has the ability to command any of the Rakasha, the horde of demons who reside within his body, and can summon demons through the pentagram-shaped hole in his chest. Due to his demonic nature he can expel mystical hellfire from his mouth capable of melting the outer layer of Iron Man's armor, and he has the ability to project rays of mystical concussive force from his hands. He also has the ability of self-levitation. After obtaining the Amulet of Azmodeus (the dwelling place of Master Pandemonium's avian familiar) he is able to teleport inter-dimensionally.

With the return of the additional fragments of "his" supposedly fragmented soul, the powers of both Master Pandemonium and the Rakasha were increased to an unrevealed degree.

Martin Preston is a talented actor, and possesses knowledge of demon lore and certain rites of magic.

In other media
Master Pandemonium makes his first animated appearance in M.O.D.O.K. voiced by Jordan Blum. This version is the host of a morning talk show called Morning with Master Pandemonium and brings on MODOK's wife Jodie to talk about her book.

References

External links
 
 Master Pandemonium at MarvelDirectory.com

Characters created by Al Milgrom
Characters created by Steve Englehart
Comics characters introduced in 1986
Fictional actors
Fictional amputees
Fictional characters who have made pacts with devils
Fictional characters from Vermont
Marvel Comics characters who use magic
Marvel Comics supervillains